The Academic Lyceum of Westminster International University in Tashkent (ALWIUT) is a Vocational education institution in the Republic of Uzbekistan which conducts its activities in close cooperation with Westminster International University in Tashkent in compliance with the requirements of the education standards of the Republic of Uzbekistan.

The Lyceum provides enhanced education in such disciplines as English, mathematics, and informatics. Second-year students have an opportunity to combine their lyceum studies with a Certificate of International Foundation Studies course validated by Westminster International University in Tashkent. Those who finish the course successfully can be directly enrolled in one of the bachelor programs offered there.

Foundation
The Academic Lyceum of Westminster International University in Tashkent was established on December 9, 2008, in accordance with Decree # 270 of the Cabinet of Ministers of the Republic of Uzbekistan. The first students of the lyceum were granted admission in 2009. It is considered to be the best educational institution in Uzbekistan.

Location
The Academic Lyceum of Westminster International University in Tashkent is in the heart of Tashkent, the capital city of the Republic of Uzbekistan in the vicinity of the well-known Amir Timur Square and Forums Palace which are on Shaxrisabz street in the Mirobod district. The lyceum is alongside Westminster International University in Tashkent so they are on the same campus.

Studies

Academic curricula
The period of studies in the lyceum is two years, like in other vocational education institution of the Republic of Uzbekistan. An academic year consists of two semesters, 20 teaching weeks each. There are winter holidays between two semesters when students can have a rest and acquire new strength for studies.

During the semester, students take two mid-term examinations and one final examination on each subject they learned. Moreover, during their studies, students undergo in-class written and oral tests. The objectivity and impartiality of work assessment is provided by the use of ID number system: Each student writes his or her special ID number instead of name and surname. During the studies, students are given special tasks (projects) they should accomplish with.

English, mathematics, and informatics are deep-learned subjects. The English language program of the Lyceum includes instructions on English reading, grammar, writing, and speaking skills. In line with the national math program, the students learn additional materials on higher mathematics as well as some part of logic. During informatics classes, the students gain technological knowledge on programming, PC security, work with graphic editors, on-line resources etc.

During the academic year, special guest lectures are organized for students.

Learning resources
The lyceum has three computer labs and library learning resources. The library includes two separate areas: a reading hall and a discussion hall. Both are equipped with furniture and computers. The lyceum's library provides students with a variety of academic and fiction books in English, Russian, Uzbek, German, Spanish, and French language. Books in English include manuals for learning English as a foreign language and textbooks on other academic disciplines such as economics, law, and business in the English language. The library's collection allows access to newspapers and magazines published in Uzbekistan and abroad. There are also electronic materials that can be downloaded from the lyceum's website, or online learning management platform, Intranet (a branch of WIUT’s intranet).

Graduation
The graduates of the Academic Lyceum of Westminster International University in Tashkent receive an official graduate diploma which allows them to apply for higher education institutions. The first graduation ceremony was held on June 21, 2012.

The Lyceum offers students in their last year of education to take a one-year, 120 credits worth Certificate of International Foundation Studies (CIFS) course verified by Westminster International University in Tashkent in accordance with British National Foundation Qualification (BNFQ). The course is taught in English. In case of successful completion of the course, graduates are at liberty to be admitted to Westminster International University in Tashkent as bachelor students and continue their education on a self-funded basis.

See also

Meat University
University of Westminster
Turin Polytechnic University in Tashkent
Inha University in Tashkent
Tashkent State Technical University
Tashkent Institute of Irrigation and Melioration
Tashkent Financial Institute
Moscow State University in Tashkent named M.V Lomonosov
Tashkent Automobile and Road Construction Institute
Tashkent State University of Economics
Tashkent State Agrarian University
Tashkent State University of Law
Tashkent University of Information Technologies
University of World Economy and Diplomacy
Universities in the United Kingdom
Education in Uzbekistan
Education in England
Education in Uzbekistan
Tashkent

References

External links
 
 
 Ask WestUP! head editors a question
 The article of United Nations in Uzbekistan (11 May 2012)

2008 establishments in Uzbekistan
Education in Tashkent
Educational institutions established in 2008
Lyceums
Universities in Uzbekistan
University of Westminster
Vocational education in Asia